Denise Richards: It's Complicated is an American reality-based television series that debuted on E! on May 26, 2008. This is the second series to be produced by Ryan Seacrest Productions, following Keeping Up with the Kardashians. The program details the daily lives of actress Denise Richards, her daughters Sam and Lola, and her family (her married younger sister Michelle and father Irv), as she deals with her career and the publicity she had received since her divorce from actor Charlie Sheen.

Episodes

Season 1

Season 2

Behind the scenes
When Richards announced her plans to do a reality show in 2007, she received a lot of negative press coverage, mostly due to objections over the use of her children in the series and overhyped publicity she has done in promoting the show prior to its debut. Richards was hoping that by doing the series that she would be able to show her side of the story.

In January 2008 Richards decided to include her two daughters with Charlie Sheen in the show, but Sheen deemed her plans "greedy, vain and exploitative". On January 25, 2008, Richards won a court case against Sheen so that she can include her daughters in the show.
When a judge rejected Sheen's request to block it, the latter urged fans to boycott it.

An agreement was reached between Charlie Sheen and Denise Richards regarding the custody of the children.

Critical reception
Along with another E! reality-based series that debuted the same day as this one, Living Lohan, Denise Richards: It's Complicated has also received negative reviews.

In one review, "Variety" summed it up this way: "She's traded on her sexuality to become one of those public figures who cavorts with other public figures, and we (or, at least, those of us inclined to watch and read about such fluff) are voyeurs."

The series has also generated mixed comments from Entertainment Weekly, which gave the series a D. In its review, Gillian Flynn notes, "It's Complicated is one of those celebs, they're just like us! shows in which we're expected to enjoy watching a famous pampered person doing things we don't want to do either.

The series also got a D from the Boston Herald, who summed it up after critic Mark A. Perigard watched the first episode: "Denise Richards’ life is one steaming pile of pig poop...Literally."

The Palm Beach Post's review of the series turned off the reviewer after critic Kevin Thompson saw the first episode: "E! is calling the new show Denise Richards: It's Complicated. I'd suggest a name change: Denise Richards: It's Boring."

In a review from Slate, they thought that first episode hit their stride too fast: "The most significant problem with the premiere episode...is that it hits its peak too early."

The Los Angeles Times compared both Richards and Lohan's shows and came to the conclusion that both shows had some flaws:  "When we tune into shows like "Living Lohan" and "It's Complicated," we come because we're curious, eager to admire, perhaps to envy, certainly to judge. Those manor houses were lovely, but they were often cold and impersonal, the furnishings too fussy to be of use, and who would want the burden of maintaining such a life? Dina Lohan may be able to get her daughter a recording session in Las Vegas, Denise Richards can afford a $9,000 grill or whistle up an instant-tan house call, but would we really want to be either of them? Lord, let's hope not."

Second and final season
Rumors spread in late August 2008 that the show was canceled due to declining ratings throughout the season. However, a rep for E! denied that the show was canceled and said decisions about a second season were still being made, "The show has not been canceled--The series has performed well for the network and decisions are still being made regarding a second season." Richards confirmed to usmagazine.com September 17, 2008 that the show was renewed for another season and starts filming "in a few months." Filming of the second and final season began in January 2009. The second and final season premiere was the highest ratings for "Denise Richards: It's Complicated" with 1.5 million viewers.

DVD releases
Season 1 was released on DVD in Australia on May 2, 2009 by Shock Records.

References

External links
 

2008 American television series debuts
2009 American television series endings
2000s American reality television series
E! original programming
English-language television shows
Television shows set in Los Angeles
Television series by Ryan Seacrest Productions